Microlaemus is a genus of beetles in the family Laemophloeidae, containing the following species:

 Microlaemus brightensis Blackburn
 Microlaemus ferrugineus Lefkovitch
 Microlaemus interceptus Grouvelle
 Microlaemus mirificus Grouvelle
 Microlaemus palpalis Waterhouse
 Microlaemus piceicollis Lea
 Microlaemus picipennis Grouvelle
 Microlaemus slades Lefkovitch
 Microlaemus strigiceps Lea
 Microlaemus sulcifrons Grouvelle
 Microlaemus sylvestris Grouvelle
 Microlaemus turneri Lefkovitch

References

Laemophloeidae